Copidognathus oculatus  is a species of mite in the Halacaridae family. The scientific name of the species was first published in 1863 by Hodge.

References

Animals described in 1863
Trombidiformes